Rick Altizer is a film director, recording artist, music producer, songwriter, multi-instrumentalist and radio show host.

In 2021, Altizer wrote and directed Show Me the Father, produced by Mark Miller and executive produced by the Kendrick Brothers. The film received an A+ CinemaScore. 
He also wrote and directed "Russ Taff: I Still Believe" (winner of 9 film awards). Rick has also directed three documentaries for Chonda Pierce: "Unashamed", "Enough", and "Laughing in the Dark" (winner of 2 film awards).

Altizer has sold over one million albums. As a recording artist, he recorded seven studio albums with three top 10 singles.
He currently is the worship leader at Hickory Grove PCA Church, in Nashville TN.  He is married to his wife, Jan, and has two sons, David and Matthew, daughter-in-law, Laura and grandsons, Ryan and Caleb.

As a recording artist, Rick is an American Christian musician, who primarily plays a contemporary Christian music, Christian rock and worship style of music. He has released eight studio albums, Blue Plate Special in 1998, Neon Fixation in 1999, Go Nova in 2000, All Tie Zur in 2001, John Lennon's Glasses in 2002, Scripture Memory – Pop Symphonies in 2007, The Rise and Fall of $AM in 2010, and "Bread" in 2019 with KMG Records, True Tunes, Not Lame Recordings, and Fuseic.

Early life
Richard Bryan Altizer was born on August 13, in Knoxville, Tennessee.

Music career
His music recording career began in 1998 with the studio album Blue Plate Special released in 1998 with KMG Records. The second studio album Neon Fixation, was released in 1999 from KMG Records. He released Go Nova with True Tunes in 2000. His fourth studio album All Tie Zur was released in 2001 from Not Lame Recordings. The subsequent studio album John Lennon's Glasses was released in 2002. He released Scripture Memory – Pop Symphonies with Fuseic Music in 2007.  The Rise and Fall of $AM was released in 2010 by Fuseic Music and "Bread" was released in 2019 by Fuseic Music.

Personal life
Altizer is married with two children, where they reside in Old Hickory, Tennessee.

Discography
Albums
 Blue Plate Special (1998, KMG)
 Neon Fixation (1999, KMG)
 Go Nova (2000, True Tunes)
 All Tie Zur (2001, Not Lame)
 John Lennon's Glasses (2002)
 Scripture Memory – Pop Symphonies (2007, Fuseic)
 The Rise and Fall of $AM (2010, Fuseic)
 Bread (2019, Fuseic)

References

External links
 Official website

Living people
American performers of Christian music
Musicians from Knoxville, Tennessee
Musicians from Nashville, Tennessee
Songwriters from Tennessee
Year of birth missing (living people)
People from Old Hickory, Tennessee